Michael Yonkers (born 1947) is an American rock musician from Minneapolis, Minnesota, United States. His work has been praised for its groundbreaking and highly experimental nature; Cole Alexander of psychedelic-rock band Black Lips said that Yonkers “kind of invented noise and drone guitar techniques," stating further that "when you think of how The Who, Jimi Hendrix and The Velvet Underground were pushing feedback at the time, he was more extreme than all three combined in terms of what he was doing.” However, his work did not reach a wide audience until decades after he began recording, due in part to a debilitating spinal injury that kept him in constant, lifelong pain.

His most well-known work is a psychedelic rock record from 1968 called Microminiature Love, which was released on vinyl by De Stijl records in 2002, and later Sub Pop, who released it on CD in July 2003. This led to re-releases of other early albums, including the psych-folk album Grimwood, originally recorded in 1971 and reissued in 2007, as well as the early 1970s works Michael Lee Yonkers and Borders Of My Mind, both reissued on Drag City in 2014. Yonkers' most recent work includes three collaborations with Minneapolis indie-rock group The Blind Shake, Carbohydrate Hydrocarbons,  Cold Town/Soft Zodiac, and Period.

Discography
 Michael Lee Yonkers (1972, reissued 2014)		
 Goodby Sunball (1974)
 Borders of My Mind (1974, reissued 2014)
 Microminiature Love (2002, Sub Pop)		
 It's Only the Yonkers (2005)
 Grimwood (2007, De Stijl Records)		
 Carbohydrate Hydrocarbons (2008, Farmgirl)	
 Cold Town/Soft Zodiac (2009, Learning Curve)		
 Bleed Out (2009)
 Lovely Gold (2010)
 Period (2011)

References

1947 births
Living people
American rock guitarists
American male guitarists
Guitarists from Minnesota
Drag City (record label) artists
20th-century American guitarists
20th-century American male musicians